Quintin Esterhuizen (born ) is a Namibian rugby union player, currently playing with the Namibia national team. His regular position is prop.

Rugby career

Esterhuizen was born in Springs in South Africa, but grew up in Windhoek.

References

External links
 

Namibian rugby union players
Living people
1994 births
People from Springs, Gauteng
Rugby union props
Namibia international rugby union players
University of South Africa alumni
People educated at Windhoek High School
Sportspeople from Gauteng